Behind the Beat: Hip Hop Home Studios is a book by Raph (Rafael Rashid) where the home studios of twenty-eight notable American and British hip-hop producers are photographed (such as DJ Premier, J Dilla, Madlib, and DJ Shadow), along with brief descriptions of the producers and their studios. It was published in 2005 by Gingko Press.

Background 
Rafael Rashid runs Crookneck, a Melbourne-based record label, and the clothing labels Blank and Princess Tina, which he co-owns. He originally photographed skateboarding, managing to get a few pictures published. He took on shooting home studios around 1995, when some of his friends began producing techno from their houses. Rashid was impressed with the quantity of gear they had in their apartments, saying:

The first studio he photographed for the book was that of DJ Shadow, whom he contacted when he passed through his town. Shadow agreed to show Rashid his house for a shoot, and then introduced him to Dan the Automator. Rashid explained that most of the people he met were through other people's relationships, saying: "Producers know producers, and that would keep rolling."

Content 
Behind the Beat contains 320 black-and-white and color photographs, all shot using a square-format Hasselblad camera.

The book features photos of the following producers' home studios: Young Einstein of Ugly Duckling, Chief Xcel of Blackalicious, DJ Spinna, Thes One of People Under The Stairs, The Nextmen, Dan The Automator (Gorillaz, Handsome Boy Modeling School), The Grouch, DJ Ransom, Farma G of Task Force, Da Beatminerz, DJ Shadow, Mario Caldato, Jr. (engineer of Beastie Boys), Huw72 of Beyond There, Cut Chemist, Sereck of Def Wish Cast, Kutmasta Kurt, Skitz, Madlib, J-Zone, DJ Premier, DJ Nu-Mark of Jurassic 5, Fat Jack, deNorthwode, DJ Swamp, DJ Design of Foreign Legion, Jehst, E-Swift of Tha Alkaholiks, J Dilla.

The book also includes an audio CD featuring music by several artists included in the book, mixed by DJ Ransom.

Reception 
The book met with a certain success with music enthusiasts, and has been re-printed several times by the editor. Rashid's pictures of J Dilla have since been acquired by the Smithsonian's National Museum of African American History and Culture.

Rachid released a sequel to this book in 2017, under the name of Back To The Lab, featuring producers such as Flying Lotus, Just Blaze, DJ Jazzy Jeff et DJ Vadim.

References

Hip hop books
2005 non-fiction books
American non-fiction books